IBM Personal Computer Picture Graphics System (PCPG) is a software developed in BASIC by Eugene Ying in the 1980s, for the IBM PC operating system.

This software is used to draw figures, add images from several libraries and include text. It has functions to digitize and print pictures.

Technical 
PCPG is designed to work on IBM PCs and compatible, running MS-DOS (and MS Windows). It actually runs in a NTVDM upon all versions of Windows. It can be stored and loaded from a 360K 5"1/4 floppy disk. Operates with keyboard. No mouse driver is required.

Type PCPG in Command Prompt to run PCPG.EXE. Other files (PCPG.DOC, .FT1, .FT2, .FT3, .FT4, .FT5, .HLP, .PAK, .PIC, .SYM) are system files (info file, fonts, help, unpacking system, startup picture, symbol library)

Features

Geometry 
Allows to draw Polygons, Involutes, Hypocycloid, Epicycloid, Rose, Sinusoid from %1 data.

Symbols 

The program features libraries of pictures, drawn using the BASIC statement DRAW.

Text 

5 fonts are available to insert text.  Both monospaced and proportional fonts were available, all of them drawn using the BASIC statement DRAW.

See also 
 Computer graphics (computer science)
 Digital imaging
 Computer representation of surfaces
 Glossary of computer graphics

References 

Graphics software